The Albergo Diffuso, an innovative concept of hospitality, was launched in Italy in the early 1980s as a means of reviving small, historic Italian villages and town centres off the usual tourist track. Translated into English as "dispersed hotel", "scattered hotel"  or "virtual hotel", it is a hotel that is not in a single block, but converted out of various historic buildings in a small community. It has to conform to the following conditions:
 Run directly by an individual owner and providing normal hotel services
 Rooms distributed in existing converted buildings in historic centres
 Central reception area with food available
 Part of a genuine community so that guests can be part of local life

The idea was promulgated by Giancarlo Dall’Ara. , there were more than 40 Italian Alberghi Diffusi, grouped under a national association, and 13 Italian regions had adopted legislation regulating the concept. Interest in Albergo Diffuso has also been shown abroad, with Croatia and Switzerland adopting the formula in their own territory, notably the town of Corippo. Corsica was expected to follow suit. Also in Dominican Republic was adopted the model of Albergo diffuso by Fabrizio Annunzi for the town of Bayahibe with the name of Bayahibe Village.

References

External links 
  Information about Albergio Diffusi
 Italian Association of Alberghi Diffusi

Dispersed hotel
Hotels in Italy